Darren Henderson (born 12 October 1966) is a Scottish former footballer. He made over 500 appearances in the Scottish Football League over a 21-year Senior career and is currently the manager of Hurlford United in the Scottish Junior Football Association, West Region.

Career

After his long career in the Scottish Football League, Henderson joined Cumnock Juniors as a player-coach where he teamed up with former Ayr United and Stenhousemuir colleague Campbell Money. He played in Cumnock's 2008 Scottish Junior Cup final defeat to Bathgate Thistle at the age of 41.

Henderson took another player-coach role at Dalry Thistle before becoming manager in his own right in November 2010. He led the club to promotion and the semi-finals of the Scottish Junior Cup before moving on to Glenafton Athletic the following summer.

In two successful seasons at Glenafton, Henderson won promotion to the West Super League Premier Division and the West of Scotland Cup before leaving the club to join Hurlford United in June 2013.

Personal life
His son Jay is also a footballer.

See also
 List of footballers in Scotland by number of league appearances (500+)

References

External links

1966 births
Living people
Footballers from Kilmarnock
Scottish footballers
Clyde F.C. players
Stranraer F.C. players
Stenhousemuir F.C. players
Clydebank F.C. (1965) players
Queen of the South F.C. players
Hamilton Academical F.C. players
Ross County F.C. players
Forfar Athletic F.C. players
Ayr United F.C. players
Raith Rovers F.C. players
Cumnock Juniors F.C. players
Dalry Thistle F.C. players
Scottish Football League players
Association football midfielders
Scottish football managers
Glenafton Athletic F.C. managers
Scottish Junior Football Association managers